The 1919 Hamburg state election was held on 16 March 1919 to elect the 160 members of the Hamburg Parliament. Despite the SPD winning an absolute majority, they still formed a coalition with the former members of the senate as well as the DDP in parliament, the SPD even allowed the incumbent independent mayor, Werner von Melle, to stay in office. This election is regarded as the first fully democratic election in Hamburg since everyone, including women, were allowed to vote.

Results

References 

Hamburg
1919
March 1919 events in Europe